The following lists events that happened during 1953 in French Indochina.

Events

May
 May 9 - France agrees to the provisional independence of Cambodia with King Norodom Sihanouk.

November
 November 9 - Laos gains its independence from France.
 November 9 - The Khmer Issarak begins to fight the French Army and Cambodia joins the First Indochina War but the Kingdom of Cambodia is established.

References

 
Indochina
Years of the 20th century in French Indochina
French Indochina
1950s in French Indochina
French Indochina